Ian Danskin is an American YouTuber who produces the Innuendo Studios channel where he discusses politics from a left-wing perspective. He is primarily known for "The Alt-Right Playbook" series of videos. The channel has been described as part of "BreadTube", an informal group of left-wing YouTube channels.

The first "Alt-Right Playbook" episode was released in October 2017. Since then the series has focused on examining and dismantling the online culture of the alt-right and "the rhetorical strategies [it] uses to legitimize itself and gain power." It uses drawings of simple figures on a grey background to illustrate its ideas.

Danskin has also discussed the Gamergate harassment campaign and the techniques used by Gamergate members to recruit people into their movement.

Daniel Schindel of Polygon listed Danskin's video "Lady Eboshi is Wrong" as one of the best video essays of 2018. Julie Muncy of Gizmodo lauded Danskin's video series about the 2015 post-apocalyptic action movie Mad Max: Fury Road. His video on Phil Fish covered the celebrity status of game developers and was the reason for Markus "Notch" Persson, creator of Minecraft, to sell the game to Microsoft.

References

External links 
 

American YouTubers
Living people
English-language YouTube channels
Year of birth missing (living people)
Video essayists
YouTube channels launched in 2015